Visone is a surname. Notable people with the surname include:

Alessandro Visone (born 1987), Italian footballer
Fabio Visone (born 1983), Italian footballer